Otto Lauri Mikael Hjelt (4 September 1900 Tuusula −3 October 1972) was a Finnish diplomat, a master of philosophy.

Hjelt was employed by the Ministry for Foreign Affairs in 1924–1932 and again in 1939. He served as the division chief in 1944–1946 and as the head of the newspaper office in 1946–1949. Between 1949 and 1951, he was the Consul General of Finland in Gothenburg and in 1951–1957 he served as a Chancellor in Budapest. Hjelt was Ambassador to Brussels in 1957–1959, Ambassador of Foreign Affairs, 1959–1961, Ambassador to Madrid 1961–1966.

Hjelt's father was Arthur Hjelt.

References 

Ambassadors of Finland to Belgium
Ambassadors of Finland to Spain
1900 births
1972 deaths
People from Tuusula